Nikola Nenov (28 August 1907 – 12 December 1996) was a Bulgarian cyclist. He competed in the individual and team road race events at the 1936 Summer Olympics.

References

External links
 

1907 births
1996 deaths
Bulgarian male cyclists
Olympic cyclists of Bulgaria
Cyclists at the 1936 Summer Olympics
Place of birth missing